John Hancock LaFitte Jr. (June 25, 1936 – October 8, 2018) was an American politician in the state of South Carolina. He served in the South Carolina House of Representatives as a member of the Republican Party from 1972 to 1975, representing Richland County, South Carolina. He was a general contractor and builder.

References

1936 births
2018 deaths
Politicians from Columbia, South Carolina
Republican Party members of the South Carolina House of Representatives
Farmers from South Carolina